"A Little Song and Dance" is the ninth episode of the second season of the American television series Agent Carter, inspired by the films Captain America: The First Avenger and Captain America: The Winter Soldier, and the Marvel One-Shot short film also titled Agent Carter. It features the Marvel Comics character Peggy Carter trying to defeat Whitney Frost, and is set in the Marvel Cinematic Universe (MCU), sharing continuity with the films of the franchise. The episode was written by Chris Dingess and directed by Jennifer Getzinger.

Hayley Atwell reprises her role as Carter from the film series, and is joined by regular cast members James D'Arcy, Chad Michael Murray, and Enver Gjokaj.

"A Little Song and Dance" originally aired on ABC on February 23, 2016, and according to Nielsen Media Research, was watched by 2.50 million viewers.

Plot

Peggy Carter and Edwin Jarvis escape capture while Jack Thompson and Daniel Sousa return to the Strategic Scientific Reserve (SSR). Joseph Manfredi sets up a new lab for Whitney Frost in an abandoned facility, where she begins trying to take all of Jason Wilkes's Zero Matter for herself. Thompson convinces Vernon Masters to use the gamma cannon against Frost, then visits Frost, warning her of Masters's treachery and offering to turn on him in exchange for a seat on the Council. Thompson then turns on Carter and Sousa, delaying them, as he actually intends to remote detonate the cannon to kill Frost, Masters, and Wilkes. Thompson turns Masters over to Frost, but the SSR manage to jam his detonator signal before he can detonate the cannon. Carter tries to get Wilkes out of the building, but he refuses to leave knowing what he has become. Thompson holds the others at gunpoint until his signal is un-jammed, though Carter is still unwilling for Wilkes to die. As Frost begins killing Masters, he notices that the cannon is being activated. However, Wilkes finds them then, and unleashes all the Zero Matter from within himself.

Production

Development
In February 2016, Marvel announced that the ninth episode of the season would be titled "A Little Song and Dance", to be written by executive producer Chris Dingess, based on a story by executive producers Michele Fazekas and Tara Butters, with Jennifer Getzinger directing.

Casting

In December 2015, Lyndsy Fonseca was revealed to be reprising her season one role of Angie Martinelli for a dream sequence in this episode. The musical sequence, dubbed an informal crossover with Dancing with the Stars, features many of the professional dancers from that series, including Louis van Amstel, Dmitry Chaplin, Karina Smirnoff, Anna Trebunskaya, Sasha Farber, and Damian Whitewood. Dancers Robert Roldan, Malene Ostergaard, Amanda Balen, Serge Onik, Jenya Shatilova, Lacey Escabar, Alla Kocherga, and Paul Kirkland are also featured in the sequence.

In February 2016, Marvel revealed that main cast members Hayley Atwell, James D'Arcy, Enver Gjokaj, Wynn Everett, Reggie Austin, and Chad Michael Murray would star as Peggy Carter, Edwin Jarvis, Daniel Sousa, Whitney Frost, Jason Wilkes, and Jack Thompson, respectively. It was also revealed that the guest cast for the episode would include Lotte Verbeek as Ana Jarvis, Lesley Boone as Rose, Bridget Regan as Dottie Underwood, Rey Valentin as Agent Vega, Kurtwood Smith as Vernon Masters, Ken Marino as Joseph Manfredi, Matt Braunger as Dr. Samberly, Max Brown as Michael Carter, Tim Soergel as Paul, Bert Rotundo as Ralph, Lon Gowan as truck driver and Russell Edge as Agent Blackwell. Soergel, Rotundo, Gowan and Edge did not receive guest star credit in the episode, while Everett and Austin received guest star credit instead of regular starring. Verbeek, Boone, Regan, Valentin, Smith, Marino, Braunger, and Brown reprise their roles from earlier in the series.

Design
The dream sequence was choreographed by van Amstel and begins in black and white, before transitioning to color.

Music
The dance number used in the dream sequence was an original song from lyricist David Zippel and series composer Christopher Lennertz, in conjunction with Butters and Fazekas. Titled "Whatcha Gonna Do (It's Up to You)", the single was performed by Atwell and Gjokaj along with the Hollywood Studio Symphony, and was released on iTunes on March 18, 2016.

Release

Broadcast
"A Little Song and Dance" was first aired in the United States on ABC on February 23, 2016.

Reception

Ratings
In the United States the episode received a 0.8/2 percent share among adults between the ages of 18 and 49, meaning that it was seen by 0.8 percent of all households, and 2 percent of all of those watching television at the time of the broadcast. It was watched by 2.50 million viewers.

References

External links
 "A Little Song and Dance" at ABC
 

Agent Carter (TV series) episodes
2016 American television episodes